Friedrich Golling (11 November 1883 – 11 October 1974) was an Austrian fencer who competed in the 1912 Summer Olympics.

Golling was part of the Austrian sabre team, which won the silver medal. In the individual foil event he was eliminated in the quarterfinals and in the individual sabre event he was eliminated in the first round.

References

External links
profile

1883 births
1974 deaths
Austrian male foil fencers
Austrian male sabre fencers
Olympic fencers of Austria
Fencers at the 1912 Summer Olympics
Olympic silver medalists for Austria
Olympic medalists in fencing
Medalists at the 1912 Summer Olympics